General elections were held in Saint Lucia on 25 April 1969. The result was a victory for the United Workers Party, which won six of the ten seats. Voter turnout was 53.9%.

Results

References

Saint Lucia
Elections in Saint Lucia
1969 in Saint Lucia
April 1969 events in North America